The Cerebellum is a bi-monthly peer-reviewed scientific journal founded in 2002. It is published by Springer Science+Business Media on behalf of the Society for Research on the Cerebellum and Ataxias. It is entirely devoted to research about the cerebellum and its roles in ataxias and other disorders.

Abstracting and indexing 
The journal is abstracted and indexed in Academic Search, Chemical Abstracts Service EBSCO databases, BIOBASE, EMBASE, Neuroscience Citation Index,  PsycINFO, PubMed/MEDLINE, Science Citation Index Expanded, Scopus, Summon by Serial Solutions, and VINITI. According to the Journal Citation Reports, the journal has a 2020 impact factor of 3.847.

References

External links 

Publications established in 2002
Neuroscience journals
Quarterly journals
Springer Science+Business Media academic journals
English-language journals